Microlophichthys microlophus, the Short-rod anglerfish, is a species of dreamer found at depths of around  in tropical and subtropical oceans.

References

Oneirodidae
Taxa named by Charles Tate Regan
Fish described in 1925